Giuliana Tesoro (née Cavaglieri) (June 1, 1921 – September 29, 2002) was an Italian-born American organic chemist with more than 125 U.S. patents. She made a number of contributions to the fiber and textile industry, including developing fire-retardant fabrics.

Biography

Cavaglieri was born in 1921 in Venice into a Jewish family. Her father, Gino Cavaglieri, managed an insurance firm; he died when Giuliana was only twelve. In 1938, after completing her high school education, she was denied access to Italy's university system due to the promulgation of the Fascist Racial Laws. She moved to Switzerland first and then in 1939 to the United States.

In the United States she was allowed to enter Yale University's graduate program and completed it in record time. In 1943, at the age of 21, Cavaglieri received her Ph.D. in Organic Chemistry. The same year she married Victor Tesoro, with whom she had two children.

Following her marriage, Giuliana Cavaglieri Tesoro worked summers for Calico Chemical Company before accepting a position as research chemist at Onyx Oil and Chemical Company in 1944. Here she was promoted to head of the organic synthesis department in 1946, assistant director of research in 1955, and associate director in 1957. She was then appointed assistant director of organic research for J.P. Stevens & Company. Late she moved to the Textile Research Institute for two years. In 1969, she accepted a position as senior chemist at Burlington Industries and was appointed director of chemical research in 1971.

In 1972 she accepted a post as Visiting Professor at the Massachusetts Institute of Technology, where she taught until 1976, remaining on the Faculty as adjunct professor and senior research scientist until 1982. She was then appointed research professor at Polytechnic Institute of New York University in Brooklyn, New York in 1982 and retired from there in 1996.

She died on September 29, 2002 in Dobbs Ferry, New York at the age of 81.

Contributions to chemistry and textiles
Tesoro made a number of advances in textile processing and organic compounds that improved textile performance for everyday consumers as well as efficiency for manufacturing systems. She developed flame-resistant fibers, designed ways to prevent static accumulation in synthetic fibers, and created improved permanent press properties for textiles.

List of committees and awards
Tesoro was a member of several committees of National Academy of Sciences and the National Research Council concerning toxic materials and fire safety. 
Other committees she was a part of include: the Fiber Society, founder/president in 1974, the American Chemical Society, the American Association of Textile Chemists and Colorists, the American Institute of Chemists, and the American Association for the Advancement of Science. 
In 1963, Tesoro was awarded the Olney Medal of the American Association of Textile Chemists and Colorists. She was the recipient of the Society of Women Engineers’ Achievement Award in 1978.

References

Bibliography

 George Carpetto, "Giuliana Cavaglieri Tesoro." In Italian Americans on the Twentieth Century, ed. George Carpetto and Diane M. Evanac. Tampa, FL: Loggia Press, 1999, pp. 372–373.

External links
Partial list of Tesoro's patents

1921 births
2002 deaths
Organic chemists
Scientists from Venice
Italian women chemists
American women chemists
20th-century Italian Jews
Italian emigrants to the United States
Jewish chemists
20th-century American women scientists
20th-century American scientists
20th-century Italian women